The Palace of Water Sports is an indoor aquatics centre in Kazan, Tatarstan, Russia which was built for the 2013 Summer Universiade. Located on the banks of the Kazanka River, the competitions in synchronized swimming, diving, swimming and water polo took place here. It later hosted the diving events for the 2015 World Aquatics Championships. As of 2018, the facility was utilized by approximately 3,000 children per day.

The temporary open arena for water polo with a spectator capacity of 3,500 was built nearby, using its service and support systems.

Construction
The Aquatic Sports Palace was built between September 2009 and October 2012. With an investment of $115 million (€90 million approximately), the design and construction was awarded by tender to a consortium of British and Russian firms specializing in architecture and engineering: SPEECH Tchoban & Kuznetsov, an architectural and design studio based in Moscow with experience in Russia and Germany, Ove Arup, a British company designers of the Bird's Nest Stadium in Beijing and PSO Kazan ООО, a Russian design and construction company established in the Republic of Tatarstan. Taking into account the venue's proximity to the Kazanka River, the building's exterior and footprint were designed to resemble a wave traveling towards the river.

Technical features

The capacity of the venue is for 3,715 spectators, including press booths and seats in the VIP area with special folding stands for athletes, which can increase capacity to 4,185 people. It is equipped with trampolines and a platform.

The building consists of three pools:

Diving – 33.3×25 m pool (allowable operating depth is 5.5 m)
Synchronized swimming – 50×25 m (maximum operating depth is 3.0 m)
Training – 50×25 m (practicing pool depth is 2.2 m)

The three pools are situated end-to-end, making the Palace one of the world's longest swimming venues with 187 metres of uninterrupted pool deck length.

Notable events
 European Junior Swimming Championships: 2019
 European Short Course Swimming Championships: 2021
 FINA Artistic Swimming World Series: 2021
 FINA Diving World Series: 2017, 2018, 2019
 FINA Swimming World Cup: 2018, 2019, 2021
 Russian Solidarity Games: 2022
 Summer Universiade: 2013
 World Aquatics Championships: 2015
 World Junior Synchronised Swimming Championships: 2016
 World Masters Championships: 2015

Event transplantations
Following the 2022 Russian invasion of Ukraine, a number of events were transplanted from the Palace of Water Sports to other recipients, including one leg of the 2022 FINA Artistic Swimming World Series that was to be the first hosted in conjunction with a FINA Diving World Series at one locality, the 2022 World Junior Swimming Championships, and the 2022 World Short Course Championships.

References

External links

 
 Kazan Aquatics Centre on Ove Arup website.
 Aquatics Palace on the site of the Volga Region's State Academy of Physical Culture, Sports and Tourism.
 Palace of Water Sports for the Universiade 2013 by SPEECH architectural firm.

Sports venues in Russia
2013 Summer Universiade
2015 World Aquatics Championships
Swimming venues in Russia
Sport in Kazan
Sport in Tatarstan
Sports venues completed in 2013
Buildings and structures in Kazan
Buildings and structures in Tatarstan